Mikhail Vyacheslavovich Tyufyakov (born 30 April 1974) is a Russian former professional footballer.

Club career
He made his Russian Football National League debut for FC Dynamo Kirov on 28 April 1992 in a game against FC Torpedo Ryazan. He played 2 seasons in the FNL for Dynamo Kirov and FC Amkar Perm.

Honours
 Russian Second Division, Zone Ural top scorer: 1999 (19 goals).
 Russian Second Division, Zone Ural/Povolzhye top scorer: 2008 (27 goals), 2010 (19 goals).
 Russian Second Division, Zone Center top scorer: 2009 (17 goals).
 Russian Second Division, Zone Center best player and best striker: 2009.
 Russian Second Division, Zone Ural-Povolzhye best striker: 2010.

References

External links
 
 

1974 births
Living people
Soviet footballers
Russian footballers
Russian expatriate footballers
Expatriate footballers in Belarus
FC Dynamo Kirov players
FC Rubin Kazan players
FC Amkar Perm players
FC Neftekhimik Nizhnekamsk players
FC KAMAZ Naberezhnye Chelny players
FC Luch Vladivostok players
FC Lada-Tolyatti players
FC Partizan Minsk players
FC Dynamo Bryansk players
FC Gornyak Uchaly players
Association football forwards
Belarusian Premier League players
FC Nosta Novotroitsk players
FC Volga Ulyanovsk players
Sportspeople from Kirov, Kirov Oblast